Anamidae is a family of Australian mygalomorph spiders. It was first described as a tribe by Simon in 1889, then raised to the subfamily Anaminae of the family Nemesiidae, before being raised to a family level by Opatova et al. in 2020.

Taxonomy
The tribe Anamini was first described by Eugène Simon in 1899. In 1982, Barbara York Main distinguished the tribe Teylini from the tribe Anamini by technical differences, including a narrow band of cuspules on the maxillae and the absence of a spine-bearing spur on the first tibia of males (except in Teyloides). A molecular phylogenetic study in 2018 found that Anamini excluding Teylini was not monophyletic, and so merged the former Teylini into Anamini, placing the tribe in the subfamily Anaminae of the family Nemesiidae. In 2020,  Opatova et al. raised the group to the rank of family, including all nine genera previously placed in the Anamini.

Genera
, the World Spider Catalog accepts the following genera. A 2018 molecular phylogenetic study divided them into four informal groups.
Teyl group
Teyl Main, 1975
Namea Raven, 1984
Chenistonia group
Chenistonia Hogg, 1901
Proshermacha Simon, 1908
Teyloides Main, 1985
Kwonkan group
Kwonkan Main, 1983
Swolnpes Main & Framenau, 2009
Aname group
Aname L. Koch, 1873
Hesperonatalius Castalanelli, Huey, Hillyer & Harvey, 2017
Unplaced
Troglodiplura Main, 1969

Distribution
All members of the family are native to Australia.

References

 
Mygalomorphae families